Blastobasis tanyptera is a moth of the  family Blastobasidae. It is found in Australia, including northern Queensland.

The larvae feed within the fruits of Eugenia paniculata.

It was first described in 1947 by Alfred Jefferis Turner, and the species epithet, tanyptera, describes it as being "long winged".

References

External links
Australian Faunal Directory

Moths of Australia
tanyptera
Moths described in 1947